Sing and Like It is a 1934 American pre-Code comedy film directed by William A. Seiter from a screenplay by Marion Dix and Laird Doyle, based on the unpublished short story So You Won't Sing, Eh? by Aben Kandel. The film stars ZaSu Pitts, Pert Kelton, and Edward Everett Horton.

Plot summary

Cast

 ZaSu Pitts as Anne Snodgrass
 Pert Kelton as Ruby
 Edward Everett Horton as Adam Frick
 Nat Pendleton as T. Fenny Syĺvester
 Ned Sparks as Toots McGuire
 John Qualen as Oswald
 Matt McHugh as Junker
 Stanley Fields as Butch
 William H. Griffith as Webster, Frink's secretary
 Roy D'Arcy as Mr. Gregory, The leading man
 Joseph Sauers as Gunner

References

External links 
 
 
 
 

1934 films
1934 comedy films
American comedy films
American black-and-white films
Films directed by William A. Seiter
1930s American films